Gísli Þorláksson (7 November 1631 – 22 March 1684) was an Icelandic bishop. He was a son of Þorlákur Skúlason and brother of Þórður Þorláksson.

Early life
Gísli was the son of Þorlákur Skúlason, the bishop of Hólar, and Kristín Gísladóttir. He grew up in Hólar, graduating from Hólar College in 1649, after which he studied at the University of Copenhagen until 1651. After returning to Iceland, Gísli served as schoolmaster in Hólar.

Bishop
Although he was barely 25 years old at the time, Gísli was named bishop of Hólar following his father's death in 1656 and was consecrated in Copenhagen in 1657. In large part, Gísli's appointment came from his family's reputation; his grandfather (Guðbrandur Þorláksson) and his father both preceded Gísli as bishop. Between Guðbrandur, Þorlákur, and Gísli, the family served as bishop of Hólar for 113 years.

He wrote several religious works which were widely distributed, including Húspostilla 1–2 (1667–1670) and a translation of Luther's Small Catechism (1660). During his time as bishop, Gísli oversaw the publishing of about 40 books by the Hólar press; it was after his death that his brother Þórður, bishop of Skálholt, received permission to move the press to Skálholt.

Personal life
Gísli married three times, but none of the marriages produced children. In 1658, he married Gróa Þorleifsdóttir (1633–1660); in 1664, Ingibjörg Benediktsdóttir (1636–1673); and in (1674): Ragnheiður Jónsdóttir (1646–1715). The  banknote highlights Ragnheiður, but also includes images of Gísli, Gróa, and Ingibjörg on the note's face.

References

Bibliography 
 Páll Eggert Ólason: Íslenskar æviskrár II.
 Sigurður Líndal: Saga Íslands VII.

1597 births
1656 deaths
17th-century Icelandic people
17th-century Lutheran bishops
Lutheran bishops of Iceland
Icelandic Lutheran clergy